El Negro que tenía el alma blanca is a 1951 Argentine musical film directed by Hugo del Carril. It is based on a novel by Alberto Insúa.

Cast
Hugo del Carril 	
María Rosa Salgado	
Antonio Casal	  
Félix Fernández	
Carlos Díaz de Mendoza
Manuel Arbó	  
María Asquerino
Antonio Riquelme
Helga Liné	      
Porfiria Sanchíz	
Manuel Aguilera
Margarita Alexandre	
Elisa Méndez		
Juana Mansó		
Mónica Pastrana

External links
 

1951 films
1950s Spanish-language films
Argentine black-and-white films
Films directed by Hugo del Carril
Argentine musical films
1951 musical films
1950s Argentine films